The post of Surveyor General of Woods, Forests, Parks and Chases was an office under the English (later the United Kingdom) Crown, charged with the management of Crown lands. The office was at one time divided between surveyors south and north of the river Trent, but in the 18th century, the two posts were combined.  In 1810, by the Act 50 Geo III Cap 65, later amended by the Act 10 Geo IV Cap 50, the functions of the post were merged with those of the Surveyor General of the Land Revenues of the Crown and became the responsibility of a new body, the Commissioners of Woods, Forests and Land Revenues.

Surveyors General of Woods, Forests, Parks and Chases

1607 (or 1608)	John Taverner
1608	Thomas Morgan
1608	Thomas Morgan & Robert Tresswell (jointly)
16—	Robert Tresswell
16—	Andrew Tresswell 
1667	— Tresswell
1667	Thomas Agar & John Madden (jointly)
1680	Thomas Agar & Charles Strode (jointly)
1688 	Philip Riley
1701 	 Thomas Hewett
1702 	Edward Wilcox
1714 	Thomas Hewett 
1716 	Edward Younge
1720 	Charles Withers
1736 	Francis Whitworth
1742 	Henry Legge
1745 	John Phillipson
1756 	John Pitt
1763 	Sir Edmond Thomas
1767 	John Pitt
1786 	John Robinson
1803	Sylvester Douglas, 1st Baron Glenbervie
1806	Lord Robert Spencer
1807	Sylvester Douglas, 1st Baron Glenbervie

References
R.B. Pugh:  The Crown Estate – an Historical Essay, London, The Crown Estate, 1960
Annual Report of Commissioners of Woods & Forests 1811
The Crown Estate publication scheme: website consulted January 2007

Lists of British people
Land management in the United Kingdom
Defunct ministerial offices in the United Kingdom
Forest law
Defunct forestry agencies